Wells Fargo Building may refer to:
Wells Fargo Building (Denver, Colorado), a Denver Landmark
Wells Fargo Building (Englewood, Colorado)
Wells Fargo Building (Davenport, Iowa)
Wells Fargo Building (Portland, Oregon)
Wells Fargo Building (Philadelphia), Pennsylvania
Wells Fargo Building (Lubbock, Texas)

See also
Wells Fargo Center (disambiguation)
Wells Fargo Plaza (disambiguation)
Wells Fargo Tower (disambiguation)